Burton on the Wolds is a village in Leicestershire, England situated on the B676 road  west of the A46 and about the same distance to the east of Loughborough, close to the county border with Nottinghamshire. In the 2011 census, the population was measured at 1,218.  The Parish Council of Burton on the Wolds, Cotes and Prestwold serves the village and its two neighbouring hamlets. The local borough council is Charnwood.

The village's name means 'farm/settlement with a fortification'.

The village is listed in the Domesday Book, showing it comprised 15 households in the year 1086. In the Middle Ages Burton was the property of Garendon Abbey. After World War II a Polish camp was set up in the village, due to its proximity to RAF Wymeswold which opened in 1942 and closed in 1957. It now hosts an industrial complex containing Jump Giants Loughborough.

Burton has its own primary school, pub and shop (in the garage).

The Lion's Head water fountain was probably built in the mid 19th century.

Prestwold Hall, which was built in the 18th century, is within the parish of Prestwold, but part of the grounds fall within the Burton on the Wolds parish.

Sport
The village has two football teams that play in the North Leicestershire League division one, and the Charnwood Sunday League division one.  Home games are played at Towles Fields.

Burton also has a long-established cricket club who in 2010 merged with one of the County's largest and most successful clubs, Barrow Town. Now named Barrow and Burton Cricket Club, the club has four teams represented in the Everards Leicestershire County Cricket League and also the Leicestershire Senior Cricket League.

References

External links

 Burton on the Wolds Primary School
 The New Barrow and Burton Village Cricket Club Web Site
 The Greyhound Inn

 

Villages in Leicestershire
Civil parishes in Leicestershire
Borough of Charnwood